In Greek mythology, Mecisteus (Ancient Greek: Μηκιστεύς Mēkisteús) was the son of Talaus and Lysimache. He was the father of Euryalus by Astyoche.

Mythology 
Mecisteus participated in the attack on the city of Thebes with the Seven against Thebes, along with his brother Adrastus. In Aeschylus' tragedy Seven Against Thebes, Mecisteus is not among the seven champions who attack the seven gates of Thebes. The Bibliotheca, however, gives one version of the legend in which he replaces Tydeus as one of the seven.  Herodotus also writes that he was one of the attackers, although whether one of the seven champions or simply another leader is not made clear. In the Iliad, Mecisteus attends the funeral games of Oedipus at Thebes, and wins all the boxing matches.

Notes

References 

 Apollodorus, The Library with an English Translation by Sir James George Frazer, F.B.A., F.R.S. in 2 Volumes, Cambridge, MA, Harvard University Press; London, William Heinemann Ltd. 1921. ISBN 0-674-99135-4. Online version at the Perseus Digital Library. Greek text available from the same website.
 Herodotus, The Histories with an English translation by A. D. Godley. Cambridge. Harvard University Press. 1920. . Online version at the Topos Text Project. Greek text available at Perseus Digital Library.
 Homer, The Iliad with an English Translation by A.T. Murray, Ph.D. in two volumes. Cambridge, MA., Harvard University Press; London, William Heinemann, Ltd. 1924. . Online version at the Perseus Digital Library.
 Homer, Homeri Opera in five volumes. Oxford, Oxford University Press. 1920. . Greek text available at the Perseus Digital Library.

Characters in the Iliad
Characters in Seven against Thebes
Argive characters in Greek mythology
Theban mythology